Korzhev  (from korzh meaning flatbread) is a Slavic masculine surname, its feminine counterpart is Korzheva. Notable people with the surname include:

Dmitry Korzhev (born 1978), Russian association football player
Geliy Korzhev (1925–2012), Russian painter

See also
Korzh